Greenville is a home rule-class city in Muhlenberg County, Kentucky, in the United States. It is the seat of its county. The population was 4,312 at the 2010 census.

History
The town was settled in 1799 on an estate donated by local landowner William Campbell in order to establish a seat of government for a new county. Greenville was not established by the state assembly until 1812, however. It was incorporated as a city in 1848.

The city was probably named for the Revolutionary War general Nathanael Greene. Local lore holds it was named by Campbell's wife after the abundant forests seen from the town's hilltop location.

Geography
Greenville is located at  (37.207158, -87.176499).

Demographics

As of the census of 2000, there were 4,398 people, 1,859 households, and 1,217 families residing in the city. The racial makeup of the city was 89.88% White, 8.75% African American, 0.16% Native American, 0.09% Asian, 0.11% from other races, and 1.00% from two or more races. Hispanics or Latinos of any race were 0.30% of the population.

There were 1,859 households, out of which 25.4% had children under the age of 18 living with them, 49.8% were married couples living together, 12.9% had a female householder with no husband present, and 34.5% were non-families. 32.7% of all households were made up of individuals, and 18.2% had someone living alone who was 65 years of age or older. The average household size was 2.19 and the average family size was 2.75.

The age distribution was 19.1% under the age of 18, 7.6% from 18 to 24, 23.7% from 25 to 44, 25.2% from 45 to 64, and 24.4% who were 65 years of age or older. The median age was 45 years. For every 100 females, there were 77.7 males. For every 100 females age 18 and over, there were 73.9 males.

The median income for a household in the city was $25,521, and the median income for a family was $35,571. Males had a median income of $37,454 versus $18,375 for females. The per capita income for the city was $19,708. About 14.2% of families and 19.0% of the population were below the poverty line, including 24.1% of those under age 18 and 15.4% of those age 65 or over.

Economy
The 1987 Encyclopedia of Kentucky refers to Greenville as "the unofficial capital of the Black Belt", a reference to the area's production of coal and dark tobacco.

Education
Greenville has a lending library, a branch of the Muhlenberg County Public Library. Schools located in town include Greenville Elementary School and Muhlenberg South Middle School.

Arts and culture

Veterans Plaza
The Muhlenberg County Veterans Mall and Plaza was originally constructed in the mid 1980s as the "Muhlenberg County War Memorial" to honor veterans who fought in World War I, World War II, the Korean War and the Vietnam War. The construction of the current plaza began in the mid 2000s as a part of the Muhlenberg County Courthouse renovations. New additions to the memorial include the Lt. Ephraim McLean Brank Memorial, located at the entrance of the plaza and the Historic Gristmill Stone which is a tribute to the song "Paradise" by John Prine.

Thistle Cottage

Thistle Cottage, formerly the Duncan Cultural Center, occupies the former home of William Graham Duncan on Cherry Street in Greenville. Constructed in 1912, the home was donated to the city of Greenville by Hamilton Richardson Duncan Sr., the last of the Duncan family to reside there, in 1986. It became the Duncan Cultural Center a year later but did not open to the public until 1989. The house became a part of Muhlenberg County Public Libraries in 2013, at which time the name reverted to Thistle Cottage, as the home was originally christened by builder William G. Duncan.

Today, the Center displays a number of artifacts related to the history and culture of Muhlenberg County, including a coal museum. It is also available for rent to host parties and other special events.

Muhlenberg County Rail Trail

The Muhlenberg County Rail Trail is a paved trail following an old Paducah and Louisville railway route between Central City, Kentucky and Greenville that is open to pedestrian and non-motorized vehicle traffic. Kentucky's most extensive rail trail conversion to date, the Muhlenberg Rail Trail opened October 20, 2000 and was named "Trail of the Month" by the Rails to Trails Conservancy in May 2004. A viewing platform and birding guide are available where the trail passes through a local wetland. The Muhlenberg County Rails to Trails Committee has railbanked an additional  of abandoned rail, possibly for a later extension into McLean County.

Notable people

 Alney McLean, former United States representative from Kentucky
 Edward Rumsey former United States representative from Kentucky
 Ray Harper, college basketball coach
 Miles Heizer, actor 
 Jim Walker, flautist 
 Ephraim McLean Brank, soldier and lawyer
 Danny Morris, baseball player
 Jonathan E. Spilman, composer, attorney and minister
 Brent Yonts, state legislator and attorney

See also
 Other places named Greenville

References

External links
 Greater Muhlenberg Chamber of Commerce

Cities in Kentucky
Cities in Muhlenberg County, Kentucky
Populated places established in 1799
County seats in Kentucky
1799 establishments in Kentucky